
Jean Valentine (April 27, 1934December 29, 2020) was an American poet and the New York State Poet Laureate from 2008 to 2010.  Her poetry collection, Door in the Mountain: New and Collected Poems, 1965–2003, was awarded the 2004 National Book Award for Poetry.

Biography
Jean Valentine was born in Chicago, Illinois, on April 27, 1934. Her father was a Navy man. She received a bachelor of arts degree and a master of arts degree from Radcliffe College, and lived most of her life in New York City, where she died on December 29, 2020.

Her most recent book, Shirt In Heaven, was published in 2015. Before that, Break the Glass, published in 2010, was a finalist for the 2011 Pulitzer Prize for Poetry.

Valentine's first book, Dream Barker (Yale University Press, 1965), was chosen in 1964 for the Yale Series of Younger Poets and won the competition the following year. She published poems widely in literary journals and magazines, including The New Yorker, and Harper's Magazine, and The American Poetry Review. Valentine was one of five poets, including Charles Wright, Russell Edson, James Tate and Louise Glück, whose work Lee Upton considered critically in The Muse of Abandonment: Origin, Identity, Mastery in Five American Poets (Bucknell University Press, 1998).  She held residencies from Yaddo, the MacDowell Colony, Ucross, and the Lannan foundation, among others.

She taught with the Graduate Writing Program at New York University, at Columbia University, at the 92nd Street Y in Manhattan, and at Sarah Lawrence College. She was a faculty member at the Vermont College of Fine Arts.

She was Distinguished Poet-in-Residence for Drew University’s MFA in Poetry & Poetry in Translation.

She was married to the late American historian James Chace from 1957–1968, and they are survived by two daughters, Sarah and Rebecca.

Valentine died in Manhattan on December 29, 2020.

Published works
Full-length poetry collections
 Shirt in Heaven (2015, Copper Canyon Press)
 Break the Glass (2010, Copper Canyon Press)
  Little Boat (2007, Wesleyan University Press)
 Door in the Mountain: New and Collected Poems, 1965–2003 (2004, Wesleyan University Press) —winner of the National Book Award
 The Cradle of the Real Life (2000, Wesleyan University Press)
 Growing Darkness, Growing Light (1997, Carnegie Mellon University Press)
 The Under Voice: Selected Poems (1995, Salmon Publishing)
 The River at Wolf (1992, Alice James Books)
 Night Lake (1992, Press of Appletree Alley: limited edition of 150, hand-bound, illustrated by Linda Plotkin.)
 Home Deep Blue: New and Selected Poems (1989, Alice James Books)
 The Messenger (1979, Farrar, Straus & Giroux)
 Ordinary Things (1974, Farrar, Straus & Giroux)
 Pilgrims (1969, Farrar, Straus & Giroux)
 Dream Barker, and Other Poems (1965, Yale University Press)

Anthology publications
 Leaving New York: Writers Look Back (Hungry Mind Press, 1995)

Anthologies edited
 The Lighthouse Keeper: Essays on the Poetry of Eleanor Ross Taylor (Hobart & William Smith, 2001).

Awards and honors
 2004 National Book Award for Poetry (for Door in the Mountain: New and Collected Poems, 1965–2003)
 1999 Shelley Memorial Award
 1991 Maurice English Poetry Award
 1988 Beatrice Hawley Award (for Home Deep Blue: New and Selected Poems)
 1976 Guggenheim Fellowship
 1972 National Endowment for the Arts – Literature Fellowship in Poetry 
 1965 Yale Series of Younger Poets

References

Bibliography
 Publishers Weekly Review of Door in the Mountain by Reed Business Information (Accessed via the Seattle Public Library and Syndetic Solutions, Inc.)
 Weiner, Tim. "James Chace, Foreign Policy Thinker, Is Dead at 72". The New York Times (Late East Coast edition), October 11, 2004, p. B.7. (Accessed via ProQuest, Document ID 710384891)

External links
 Jean Valentine website
 Video: Poetry Reading: Jean Valentine
 Poetry Society of America: Crossroads > A Conversation with Jean Valentine > by Eve Grubin
 Jean Valentine Papers Schlesinger Library, Radcliffe Institute, Harvard University 
 Audio: Jean Valentine Reading for WNYC Radio
 The American Poetry Review > Jan/Feb 2005 Vol. 34/No. 1 > Jean Valentine 
 Library of Congress Online Catalog
 Author Website > Jean Valentine: Books/Bio
 Author Website > Jean Valentine C.V.
 The New York Times > A Poet in Yonkers > by Hershenson, Roberta > Nov. 28, 2004, section 14WC, p. 13
 Academy of American Poets > Jean Valentine
 Novel Guide

1934 births
2020 deaths
American women poets
Columbia University faculty
National Book Award winners
National Endowment for the Arts Fellows
Poets from New York (state)
Poets Laureate of New York (state)
Radcliffe College alumni
Sarah Lawrence College faculty
The New Yorker people
Vermont College of Fine Arts faculty
Writers from Chicago
Yale Younger Poets winners
20th-century American poets
20th-century American women writers
21st-century American poets
21st-century American women writers
American women academics